"Summons for a Recluse" is one of the 17 major sections of the ancient Chinese poetry collection Chu ci, also known as The Songs of the South or The Songs of Chu. The "Summons for a Recluse" is a short but influential poem (Hawkes, 2011 [1985]: 244). The actual poet is not known; but, Liu An or an associate are likely as authors (Hawkes, 2011 [1985]: 243).

See also
Chu ci
List of Chuci contents
Liu An
Liu Xiang (scholar)
Qu Yuan
Song Yu
Wang Yi (librarian)

Sources
招隱士

References
Hawkes, David, translator and introduction (2011 [1985]). Qu Yuan et al., The Songs of the South: An Ancient Chinese Anthology of Poems by Qu Yuan and Other Poets. London: Penguin Books. 

Chinese poems